Chadds Ford Historic District is a national historic district located at Chadds Ford Township, Delaware County, Pennsylvania.  The district includes 17 contributing buildings in Chadds Ford village. Notable buildings include the Chads Ford Inn (1807-1810), Merchant Mill (1864), a row of houses built between 1840 and 1850, the bridge across Brandywine Creek, and the Christian C. Sanderson Museum. Located in the district are the separately listed Chad House and N. C. Wyeth House and Studio.

It was added to the National Register of Historic Places in 1971.

References

External links

Christian C. Sanderson Museum website

Historic districts in Delaware County, Pennsylvania
Historic districts on the National Register of Historic Places in Pennsylvania
National Register of Historic Places in Delaware County, Pennsylvania
Chadds Ford Township, Delaware County, Pennsylvania